S-train is a type of suburban railway system.

S Train and similar may also refer to:
S-train (Copenhagen), an urban rapid transit network in Denmark
S-Train (Korail), a South Korean sightseeing train
S-Train (Seibu), an express train service operated by Seibu Railway in Tokyo, Japan
S (New York City Subway service), one of three subway services of the New York City Subway:
Franklin Avenue Shuttle
42nd Street Shuttle (also called the Grand Central/Times Square Shuttle) (internally referred to as the 0)
Rockaway Park Shuttle (also called Rockaway Shuttle) (internally referred to as the H)
S Castro Shuttle in San Francisco
S Line (Utah Transit Authority), a streetcar running between Salt Lake City and South Salt Lake in Utah, United States that is operated by the Utah Transit Authority
MTR CNR Changchun EMU